Columbus is a consolidated city-county located on the west-central border of the U.S. state of Georgia. Columbus lies on the Chattahoochee River directly across from Phenix City, Alabama. It is the county seat of Muscogee County, with which it officially merged in 1970. Columbus is the second-largest city in Georgia (after Atlanta), and fields the state's fourth-largest metropolitan area. At the 2020 census, Columbus had a population of 206,922, with 328,883 in the Columbus metropolitan area. The metro area joins the nearby Alabama cities of Auburn and Opelika to form the Columbus–Auburn–Opelika Combined Statistical Area, which had an estimated population of 486,645 in 2019.

Fort Benning, the United States Army's Maneuver Center of Excellence and a major employer, is located south of the city in southern Muscogee and Chattahoochee counties. Columbus is home to museums and tourism sites, including the National Infantry Museum, dedicated to the U.S. Army's Infantry Branch. It has the longest urban whitewater rafting course in the world constructed on the Chattahoochee River.

History

Beginnings

This was for centuries the traditional territory of the Creek Indians, who became known as one of the Five Civilized Tribes of the Southeast after European contact. Those who lived closest to white-occupied areas conducted considerable trading and adopted some European-American ways.

Founded in 1828 by an act of the Georgia Legislature, Columbus was situated at the beginning of the navigable portion of the Chattahoochee River and on the last stretch of the Federal Road before entering Alabama. The city was named for Christopher Columbus. The plan for the city was drawn up by Dr. Edwin L. DeGraffenried, who placed the town on a bluff overlooking the river. Across the river to the west, where Phenix City, Alabama, is now located, lived several tribes of the Creek and other Georgia and Alabama indigenous peoples.  Most Creeks moved west with the 1826 Treaty of Washington.  Those who stayed and made war were forcibly removed in 1836.

The river served as Columbus's connection to the world, particularly enabling it to ship its commodity cotton crops from the plantations to the international cotton market via New Orleans and ultimately Liverpool, England. The city's commercial importance increased in the 1850s with the arrival of the railroad. In addition, textile mills were developed along the river, bringing industry to an area reliant upon agriculture. By 1860, the city was one of the more important industrial centers of the South, earning it the nickname the Lowell of the South, referring to an important textile mill town in Massachusetts.

Civil War and Reconstruction

When the Civil War broke out in 1861, the industries of Columbus expanded their production; this became one of the most important centers of industry in the Confederacy. During the war, Columbus ranked second to Richmond in the manufacture of supplies for the Confederate army. The Eagle Manufacturing Company made various textiles, especially woolens for Confederate uniforms. The Columbus Iron Works manufactured cannons and machinery for the nearby Confederate Navy shipyard, Greenwood and Gray made firearms, and Louis and Elias Haimon produced swords and bayonets. Smaller firms provided additional munitions and sundries. As the war turned in favor of the Union, each industry faced exponentially growing shortages of raw materials and skilled labor, as well as worsening financial opportunities.

Unaware of Lee's surrender to Grant and the assassination of Abraham Lincoln, Union and Confederates clashed in the Battle of Columbus, Georgia, on Easter Sunday, April 16, 1865, when a Union detachment of two cavalry divisions under Maj. Gen. James H. Wilson attacked the lightly defended city and burned many of the industrial buildings. John Stith Pemberton, who later developed Coca-Cola in Columbus, was wounded in this battle.  Col. Charles Augustus Lafayette Lamar, owner of the last slave ship in America, was also killed here. A historic marker erected in Columbus notes that this was the site of the "Last Land Battle in the War from 1861 to 1865".

Reconstruction began almost immediately and prosperity followed. Factories such as the Eagle and Phenix Mills were revived and the industrialization of the town led to rapid growth, causing the city to outgrow its original plan. The Springer Opera House was built during this time, attracting such notables as Irish writer Oscar Wilde. The Springer is now the official State Theater of Georgia.

By the time of the Spanish–American War, the city's modernization included the addition of a new waterworks, as well as trolleys extending to outlying neighborhoods such as Rose Hill and Lakebottom. Mayor Lucius Chappell also brought a training camp for soldiers to the area. This training camp, named Camp Benning, grew into present-day Fort Benning, named for General Henry L. Benning, a native of the city.

Confederate Memorial Day

In the spring of 1866, the Ladies Memorial Association of Columbus passed a resolution to set aside one day annually to memorialize the Confederate dead. The secretary of the association, Mrs. Charles J. Williams, was directed to write a letter inviting the ladies of every Southern state to join them in the observance. The letter was written in March 1866 and sent to representatives of all of the principal cities in the South, including Atlanta, Macon, Montgomery, Memphis, Richmond, St. Louis, Alexandria, Columbia, and New Orleans. This was the beginning of the influential work by ladies' organizations to honor the war dead.

The date for the holiday was selected by Elizabeth Rutherford Ellis. She chose April 26, the first anniversary of Confederate General Johnston's final surrender to Union General Sherman at Bennett Place, North Carolina. For many in the South, that act marked the official end of the Civil War.

In 1868, General John A. Logan, commander in chief of the Union Civil War Veterans Fraternity called the Grand Army of the Republic, launched the Memorial Day holiday that is now observed across the entire United States. General Logan's wife said he had borrowed from practices of Confederate Memorial Day. She wrote that Logan "said it was not too late for the Union men of the nation to follow the example of the people of the South in perpetuating the memory of their friends who had died for the cause they thought just and right."

While two dozen cities across the country claim to have originated the Memorial Day holiday, Bellware and Gardiner firmly establish that the holiday began in Columbus. In The Genesis of the Memorial Day Holiday in America, they show that the Columbus Ladies Memorial Association's call to observe a day annually to decorate soldiers' graves inaugurated a movement first in the South and then in the North to honor the soldiers who died during the Civil War.

20th century
With the expansion of the city, leaders established Columbus College, a two-year institution, which later evolved into Columbus State University, now a comprehensive center of higher learning and part of the University System of Georgia.

The city government and the county consolidated in 1971, the first such consolidation in Georgia and one of only 16 in the U.S. at the time.

Expanding on its industrial base of textile mills, the city is the home of the headquarters for Aflac, Synovus, and TSYS.

From the 1960s through the 1980s, the subsidized construction of highways and suburbs resulted in drawing off the middle and upper classes, with urban blight, white flight, and prostitution in much of downtown Columbus and adjacent neighborhoods. Early efforts to halt the gradual deterioration of downtown began with the saving and restoration of the Springer Opera House in 1965. It was designated as the State Theatre of Georgia, helping spark a movement to preserve the city's history. This effort has documented and preserved various historic districts in and around downtown.

Through the late 1960s and early 1970s, large residential neighborhoods were built to accommodate the soldiers coming back from the Vietnam War and for those associated with Fort Benning. These range from Wesley Woods to Leesburg to Brittney and Willowbrook and the high-end Sears Woods and Windsor Park. Large tracts of blighted areas were cleaned up. A modern Columbus Consolidated Government Center was constructed in the city center. A significant period of urban renewal and revitalization followed in the mid- to late 1990s.

With these improvements, the city has attracted residents and businesses to formerly blighted areas. Municipal projects have included construction of a softball complex, which hosted the 1996 Olympic softball competition; the Chattahoochee RiverWalk; the National Civil War Naval Museum at Port Columbus; and the Coca-Cola Space Science Center. Other notable projects were the expansion of the Columbus Museum and road improvements to include a new downtown bridge crossing the Chattahoochee River and into Phenix City. During the late 1990s, commercial activity expanded north of downtown along the I-185 corridor.

21st century
During the 2000s, the city began a major initiative to revitalize the downtown area. The project began with the South Commons, an area south of downtown containing the softball complex, A. J. McClung Memorial Stadium, Golden Park, the Columbus Civic Center, and the Jonathan Hatcher Skateboard Park. The National Infantry Museum was constructed in South Columbus, located outside the Fort Benning main gate.

In 2002, Columbus State University, which previously faced expansion limits due to existing residential and commercial districts surrounding it, began a second campus downtown, starting by moving the music department into the newly-opened RiverCenter for the Performing Arts. The university's art, drama, and nursing departments also moved to downtown locations. Such initiatives have provided Columbus with a cultural niche; downtown features modern architecture mixed among older brick facades.

The Ready to Raft 2012 project created an estimated 700 new jobs and is projected to bring in $42 million annually to the Columbus area. Demolishing an up-river dam allowed the project to construct the longest urban whitewater rafting course in the world. According to the Columbus Convention and Visitors Bureau, this initiative, in addition to other outdoor and indoor tourist attractions, led to around 1.8 million visitors coming to Columbus during the city's 2015 fiscal year.

The city predicts that an additional 30,000 soldiers will be trained annually at Fort Benning in upcoming years due to base realignment and closure of other facilities. As a result, Columbus is expected to experience a major population increase.

Geography

Columbus is one of Georgia's three Fall Line Cities, along with Augusta and Macon. The Fall Line is where the hilly lands of the Piedmont plateau meet the flat terrain of the coastal plain. As such, Columbus has a varied landscape of rolling hills on the north side and flat plains on the south. The fall line causes rivers in the area to decline rapidly towards sea level. Textile mills were established here in the 19th and early 20th centuries to take advantage of the water power from the falls.

Interstate 185 runs north-south through the middle of the city, with nine exits within Muscogee County. U.S. Route 27, U.S. Route 280, and Georgia State Route 520 (known as South Georgia Parkway) all meet in the interior of the city. U.S. Route 80 runs through the northern part of the city, locally known as J.R. Allen Parkway; Alternate U.S. Route 27 and Georgia State Route 85 run northeast from the city, locally known as Manchester Expressway.

Climate
Columbus has a humid subtropical climate (Köppen Cfa). Daytime summer temperatures often reach highs in the mid-90°Fs, and low temperatures in the winter average in the upper 30s. Columbus is often considered a dividing line or "natural snowline" of the southeastern United States with areas north of the city receiving snowfall annually, with areas to the south typically not receiving snowfall every year or at all.  Columbus is within USDA hardiness zone 8b in the city center and zone 8a in the suburbs.

Cityscape

Columbus is divided into five geographic areas:

Downtown,  also sometimes called "Uptown" (though "Uptown" is actually the title given to both a nonprofit organization operating to encourage area growth and development or "urban renewal" in the city and also to the actual physical area of that development itself, which is an expanding subsection of the downtown district located in the areas from Broadway to the Chattahoochee River) is the city's central business district, and home to multiple historic districts, homes, and churches, such as the Columbus Historic Riverfront Industrial District, the Mott House, and the Church of the Holy Family.
East Columbus is a predominantly residential area located east of MidTown.

MidTown is a residential and commercial area located directly east of Downtown; several historic districts have been designated. It is the location of the corporate headquarters of Aflac.
North Columbus, also called Northside, is a diverse suburban area, home to established neighborhoods and subdivisions, such as Green Island Hills and Oldtown. It has multiple shopping and lifestyle areas.
South Columbus is situated just south of the MidTown region, and directly north of Fort Benning. It is the site of the National Infantry Museum, honoring the history of infantry forces in the U.S. Army. The museum was located here in an effort to introduce jobs and attract visitors to stimulate a variety of activities. It has had bars, honky tonks, and other businesses that appeal to young male soldiers from Fort Benning.

Surrounding cities and towns

The Columbus Metropolitan Area includes four counties in Georgia, and one in Alabama. The Columbus-Auburn-Opelika, GA-AL Combined Statistical Area includes two additional counties in Alabama. A 2013 Census estimate showed 316,554 in the metro area, with 501,649 in the combined statistical area.

Demographics

2020 census

At the 2020 United States census, there were 206,922 people, 73,134 households, and 45,689 families residing in the city.

2010 census
At the 2010 U.S. Census, Columbus had a total population of 189,885, up from 186,291 in the 2000 Census. The 2010 Census reported 189,885 people, 72,124 households, and 47,686 families residing in the city. The racial makeup of the city was 46.3% White, 45.5% African American, 2.2% Asian, 0.2% Native American, 0.14% Pacific Islander, and 1.90% from other races. Hispanics or Latinos of any race were 6.4% of the population.

Of the 69,819 households, 34.6% had children under the age of 18 living with them, 44.7% were married couples living together, 19.6% had a female householder with no husband present, and 31.7% were notfamilies; 26.7% of all households were made up of individuals, and 9.4% had someone living alone who was 65 years of age or older. The average household size was 2.54 and the average family size was 3.08.

In the city, the population was distributed as 25.6% under the age of 18, 11.9% from 18 to 24, 29.8% from 25 to 44, 19.7% from 45 to 64, and 11.6% who were 65 years of age or older. The median age was 33 years. For every 100 females, there were 94.7 males. For every 100 females age 18 and over, there were 91.6 males.

The median income for a household in the city was $41,331, and for a family was 41,244. Males had a median income of $30,238 versus $24,336 for females. The per capita income for the city was $22,514. About 12.8% of families and 15.7% of the population were below the poverty line, including 22.0% of those under age 18 and 12.1% of those age 65 or over.

Religion
Columbus has roughly 200 Christian churches, with the Southern Baptist Convention being the largest denomination by number of churches. Columbus is also home to three Kingdom Halls for Jehovah's Witnesses, and one Greek Orthodox Church. Other religions are represented by two synagogues, two Seventh-day Adventist churches, three mosques, a Hindu temple (the latter two reflecting an increasing number of immigrants in the region from Asia), and a Unitarian Universalist congregation.

Economy
Companies headquartered in Columbus include Aflac, TSYS, Realtree, Synovus, and the W. C. Bradley Co.

Top employers
According to Columbus' 2017 Comprehensive Annual Financial Report, the top employers in the city are:

Arts and culture

Points of interest

Museums
 Founded in 1953, the Columbus Museum (accredited by the American Alliance of Museums) contains artifacts of regional history and works of American art. It mounts displays from its permanent collection, as well as temporary exhibitions. It is the largest art and history museum in Georgia.
 Moved from its previous location in Lumpkin, Columbus is now home to Historic Westville. With 17 buildings currently on site and interpreters throughout the village (such as a blacksmith and carpenter), guests can to go on self-guided tours learning about the homes and crafts of the 19th century.
 The National Civil War Naval Museum at Port Columbus is a 40,000-square-foot (3,700 m²) facility that opened in 1962. It features two original Civil War military vessels, uniforms, equipment, and weapons used by the Union and Confederate navies.
 The Coca-Cola Space Science Center opened in 1996 for the purpose of public education in science, physics, and astronomy. It includes four flight simulators and a planetarium.
 The National Infantry Museum and Soldier Center opened in June 2009, and includes displays related to the history of the infantry from the founding of the nation to the present. Its IMAX theatre shows related films and special productions.
 The Bo Bartlett Center is a 18,000+ square foot museum and gallery space. The venue features a permanent display of large-scale paintings by Columbus native Bo Bartlett, as well as rotating exhibitions by renowned contemporary artists.
 The W.C. Bradley Museum is an 11,000 square foot art museum that features the art collection of the W.C. Bradley Company. Notable artists in the collection include Bo Bartlett and Garry Pound.

Shopping
Columbus is served by one major indoor shopping mall, Peachtree Mall, which is anchored by major department stores Dillard's, Macy's, and J.C. Penney. The total retail floor area is 821,000 f2t (76,300 m2). Major strip malls include Columbus Park Crossing, which opened in 2003, and The Landings, which opened in 2005. Columbus is also served by The Shoppes at Bradley Park, a lifestyle center.

MidTown contains two of the city's early suburban shopping centers (the Village on 13th and St. Elmo), both recently renovated and offering local shops, restaurants, and services.

Major venues

Major venues in the city of Columbus:

 A. J. McClung Memorial Stadium, a football stadium, was the site of the football games between the Georgia Bulldogs and the Auburn Tigers (the Deep South's Oldest Rivalry) from 1916 to 1958.  It became the home of college football's Pioneer Bowl in December 2010, and hosts annual rivalry games between Tuskegee University and Morehouse College, as well as between Albany State University and Fort Valley State University.
The Bradley Theater, a performance theatre, was opened in mid-1940 by Paramount Pictures.
 Columbus Civic Center, a 10,000-seat multi-purpose arena, opened in 1996. It is the primary arena used for concert and professional sporting events in Columbus. The Columbus Lions indoor football team and Columbus River Dragons ice hockey team both call the Civic Center home.
 Golden Park, a 5,000 seat baseball stadium, was the former home to the Columbus Catfish and the minor-league Columbus Redstixx, and as of June 2021, is the host stadium  of the Columbus Chatt-A-Hoots. It was also the site of the softball events of the 1996 Summer Olympics. It opened in 1926, making it the oldest baseball park in the city.
 RiverCenter for the Performing Arts, a 2,000-seat modern performance theatre, first opened in 2002 and is operated by the Columbus nonprofit organization RiverCenter Inc. It is commonly used for local events, and occasionally used for nationally recognized performances.
 Springer Opera House, a historic live performance theater located in downtown, opened in early 1871. Former United States President Jimmy Carter proclaimed it the State Theatre of Georgia for the 1971–72 season. The legislature made the designation permanent in 1992.

Historic districts

Columbus is home to nine historic districts, all listed in the National Register of Historic Places listings in Muscogee County, Georgia. They are:

Bibb City Historic District
Columbus Historic District
Columbus Historic Riverfront Industrial District
Dinglewood Historic District
Peacock Woods-Dimon Circle Historic District
Weracoba-St. Elmo Historic District
Wynn's Hill-Overlook-Oak Circle Historic District
Wynnton Village Historic District
Waverly Terrace Historic District

Sports

Parks and recreation

Columbus is home to upwards of 50 parks, four recreation centers, four senior centers and parks, and Standing Boy Creek Wildlife Management Area.

Walking trails
The Chattahoochee RiverWalk is a  walking/bike trail that connects users from Downtown to South Columbus and the northern section of Fort Benning.
The Columbus Fall Line Trace is an  fitness trail that runs from Downtown to the northeastern section of the city.  
The Black Heritage Trail is a National Recreation Trail of historic and cultural significance.

Whitewater kayaking, rafting, and zip-line
The Chattahoochee River whitewater opened in 2012. After both the Eagle & Phenix Dam and the City Mills Dams were breached, river flow was restored to natural conditions, allowing the course to be created. The  course is the longest urban whitewater rafting and kayaking in the world, and has been ranked the world's best manmade whitewater course by USA Today. It also features the Blue Heron Adventure, a zip-line course connecting users from the Georgia side of the river to the Alabama side on an interstate zip-line over the Chattahoochee River. The course continues with several zip-lines and a ropes course on the Alabama side and completes with another zip-line back to Georgia.

It has become a hub for whitewater kayakers, with outstanding standing waves year-round. In mid-winter it is referred to as the "Wintering Grounds" for big wave surfing athletes and enthusiasts.

Law and government

Elected officials

Mayor

 B. H. "Skip" Henderson III

City Council
The city council of Columbus, known as the Columbus Council, is composed of ten elected council members, eight of whom serve individual districts and two of whom serve the city at large.

Education

Primary and secondary education
The Muscogee County School District holds preschool to grade 12, and consists of 35 elementary schools, 12 middle schools, and nine high schools. The district has over 2,000 full-time teachers and over 31,899 students.

Libraries

Columbus is served by four branches of the Chattahoochee Valley Libraries:
Columbus Public Library
Mildred L. Terry Public Library
North Columbus Public Library
South Columbus Public Library

Higher education

Public
Columbus State University
Columbus Technical College
Georgia Military College – main campus in Milledgeville, Georgia

Private, for profit
Christian Life School of Theology
Miller-Motte Technical College – main campus in Wilmington, North Carolina
Rivertown School of Beauty
Southeastern Beauty School
Strayer University – main campus in Baltimore, Maryland

Private, nonprofit
Embry-Riddle Aeronautical University Fort Benning – main campus in Daytona Beach, FL
Mercer University School of Medicine - main campus in Macon, Georgia

Media and communications

Infrastructure

Transportation

Airport
The Columbus Airport  is the metro area's primary airport and the fourth-busiest airport in Georgia. It is located just off I-185, exit 8. It is served by  Endeavor Air’s Delta Connection service, offering several daily flights to Atlanta.

Highways
 Interstate 185

U.S. Routes
  U.S. Route 27
 U.S. Route 27 Alternate
  U.S. Route 80
  U.S. Route 280

Georgia state routes
  S.R. 1
  S.R. 22
 State Route 22 Connector
 State Route 22 Spur
 S.R. 85
 S.R. 219
 S.R. 411 (unsigned designation for I-185)
 S.R. 520
 S.R. 540 (Fall Line Freeway)

Public transit
METRA Transit System is the primary provider of mass transportation in Muscogee County, currently operating 10 routes in Columbus. The current public transportation services are operated as a function of the Columbus Consolidated Government under METRA.
Greyhound Lines provides intercity bus service with the Columbus station located on Veterans Parkway, Downtown Columbus.

Through the 1960s, passenger trains of the Central of Georgia Railway made stops at Columbus Union Station, including the north-south Chicago-Florida trains, the Illinois Central Railroad's City of Miami, and Seminole. Other trains included local Central of Georgia trains to Atlanta, Albany and Macon. The final trains in 1971 were the City of Miami and the Man O' War to Atlanta.

Sister cities
Columbus has these official sister cities:
  Zugdidi, Georgia (country)
  Kiryū, Gunma, Japan
  Bistriţa, Romania
  Taichung, Taiwan

See also 

 List of people from Columbus, Georgia
 List of neighborhoods in Columbus, Georgia
 List of mayors of Columbus, Georgia
 List of schools in Muscogee County, Georgia
 Metro Columbus
 Shannon Hosiery Mill
 List of U.S. cities with large Black populations

References

Further reading
Our Town: An Introduction to the History of Columbus, Georgia by Roger Harris, 1992, Historic Columbus Foundation
Columbus, Georgia (Black America Series) by Judith Grant, 1999, Arcadia Publishing
Columbus Celebrates The Millennium: An International Quest (The American Enterprise Series) by Pamela Baker and Delane Chappell, 1999, Community Communications Inc.
Yankee Blitzkrieg: Wilson's Raid Through Alabama and Georgia by James Pickett Jones, 2000, University Press of Kentucky
Columbus, Georgia in Vintage Postcards (GA) (Postcard History Series) by Kenneth H. Thomas, Jr., 2001, Arcadia Publishing
Enriching Lives: A History of Columbus State University, by Reagan L. Grimsley, 2008. Donning Publishing.
Historic Linwood Cemetery (Images of America: Georgia) by Linda J. Kennedy, 2004, Arcadia Publishing
Hell's Broke Loose in Georgia: Survival in a Civil War Regiment by Scott Walker, 2007, University of Georgia Press
Lower Chattahoochee River (GA) (Images of America) by The Columbus Museum, 2007, Arcadia Publishing
Columbus, Georgia, 1865: The Last True Battle of the Civil War, by Charles A. Misulia, 2010, University of Alabama Press

Bibliography

External links

 Official homepage
 Columbus Georgia Consolidated Government
 Columbus (entry in the New Georgia Encyclopedia)
 
 

 

 
Cities in Georgia (U.S. state)
Cities in Muscogee County, Georgia
County seats in Georgia (U.S. state)
Populated places established in 1828
Columbus metropolitan area, Georgia
Consolidated city-counties
Georgia populated places on the Chattahoochee River
1828 establishments in Georgia (U.S. state)